Toanot Rabbaniyot, or Toanot ("Women Rabbinical Advocates"), refer to women who serve as legal advocates and representatives within the traditional Jewish courts of law. Toanot typically argue cases on behalf of female claimants in the areas of divorce law. This role is well-established in the Israeli rabbinical court system. The introduction of the role of woman representative and advocate was the result of instances when women would not receive fair divorce settlements in Israeli rabbinical courts. The innovation of Toanot is described as allowing Orthodox women to serve in a rabbinical leadership role that does not require rabbinical ordination.

Development 
In the early 1990s, Rabbi Shlomo Riskin issued a challenge in Israel's High Court to the laws that prevented women from serving as advocates in the rabbinical court. The ruling was made in Riskin's favor and subsequently, Riskin established the first program for the training of women advocates in the religious courts. Graduates of the program are trained in Jewish law (Halacha) pertaining to women's rights in marriage and divorce proceedings. Their primary role is to defend the rights of women whose husbands refuse to grant them a divorce (agunot) in religious court proceedings, helping them to secure a religious divorce (get).

Supporters of the change argue that the introduction of women advocates have helped rabbinical rulings to be more impartial, and not favor men over women.

See also 
 Yoetzet Halacha
 Women Torah scholars

References 

Religion in Israel
Jewish courts and civil law
Hebrew words and phrases in Jewish law
Women rabbis and Torah scholars
Divorce in Judaism